Lake Placid 2 is a 2007 American made-for-television comedy horror film directed by David Flores. It is a sequel to Lake Placid (1999) and the second installment in the Lake Placid film series, telling the story of man-eating crocodiles who terrorize the local community. The film premiered on April 28, 2007 on the Sci-Fi Channel and was released direct to video on January 29, 2008.

Plot 

Researchers Frank Mills and Tillman are exploring the lake on a rubber tube raft until Tillman is dragged into the water and killed by a crocodile. In Aroostook County, Maine, Frank reports this to sheriff James Riley, showing him Tillman's severed body parts. James, Frank, and wildlife officer Emma Warner venture out onto the lake, where they find more of Tillman's remains. Meanwhile, three friends, Mike, Edie, and Sharon are killed by a crocodile while swimming in the lake. James, Emma and Frank stop at the house of Sadie Bickerman, an elderly hermit who has allegedly been feeding the crocodiles, to interrogate her about her missing sister Delores, but she refuses to answer nor let them in the house. A poacher named Jack Struthers and his assistant Ahmad land their plane on the lake, hoping to kill the crocodiles after getting a tip from a local.

The sheriff's son, Scott Riley, wanders into the woods, and appears to be stalked by the incoming crocodile. It turns out to be Daisy, the pet dog of Kerri. Scott then meets Kerri and her boyfriend, Thad. Daisy barks at something moving in the lake, but Kerri sees nothing. Sadie talks with a photographer at a boat dock before going back to her cabin, and the photographer is killed purposely by a crocodile while taking pictures.

Riding the boat again, James suddenly slows down, knocking Frank into the lake, but James and Emma bring him back on board to safety. When a crocodile appears, James draws his gun, but the crocodile dives under to knock the three off the boat. The boat is demolished, and all three get to land unharmed. The three meet Struthers and Ahmad, who flew a plane to distract the crocodile.

The next scene shows Rachel and Larry, along with Scott, Kerri, and Thad venturing in the woods to another part of the lake. With the Sheriff's team, Deputy Dale Davis comes in to unload the boat, while the crew sets up a tent for overnight camping. They see a wild boar trapped in a rope net and feed it to the crocodile. The crew neutralizes the crocodile with their guns and Dale ties the mouth with a rope, but the crocodile easily breaks free, severs Dale's arm and devours him. Frank dies from a fall and the others move on.

Meanwhile, Rachel is killed by the crocodile who splits her in half and she was wearing a thong, while Larry manages to escape. The other three of the younger group find eggs in the woods. Thad breaks some eggs and is killed by a crocodile. The Sheriff's group feed a boar carcass to one crocodile but a harpoon arrow accidentally damages Struthers' plane. James and Ahmad abandon the boat, and Struthers is thrown off the plane, but Ahmad neutralizes the crocodile. Thunderstorms strike during the night, forcing the crew to their tents. Scott and Kerri are stranded in the woods until they find a horrified Larry. The Sheriff's crew is fast asleep in their tents until the crocodile attacks and kills Ahmad.

The next morning, Scott, Kerri, and Larry climb a tree to avoid a third crocodile, but Larry falls from the tree and is killed. James finds the two surviving teenagers, and kills the crocodile with a grenade launcher. Sadie lets the teenagers inside her house for safety and reveals that there are actually four crocodiles before tricking them into entering the lake in hopes of feeding them to the crocodiles and is then devoured by a crocodile herself. The police battles one crocodile, and Emma kills it by puncturing its mouth with a jackknife. Struthers hangs upside down on a tree and he is decapitated by the last crocodile. James kills it with multiple explosive substances that destroys the crocodile's nest.

At the end, Scott, Kerri, James, and Emma leave the lake together. Scott and Kerri reunite with Daisy, who got separated from them earlier, and the two kiss. James and Emma proceed to take the crocodile's eggs that Emma took from the nest earlier to the scientific lab for analysis.

Cast
 John Schneider as Sheriff James Riley
 Sarah Lafleur as Emily "Emma" Warner
 Sam McMurray as Jack Struthers
 Chad Michael Collins as Scott Riley
 Alicia Ziegler as Kerri
 Joe Holt as Ahmad
 Cloris Leachman as Sadie Bickerman
 Ian Reed Kesler as Thad Sanders
 Justin Urich as Larry
 V.J. Benson as Rachel
 Robert Blush as Frank
 Jonas Talkington as Cal Miner
 Terence H. Winkless as Deputy Dale Davis
 Michael McCoy as Tillman
 Andrea Enright as Female Deputy
 Jasmina Toshkova as Edi
 Vlado Mihaylov as Mike
 Yana Marinova as Sharon

Production 
The film was filmed in Bulgaria, Romania in 2006.

Reception 

The film received generally negative reviews, citing an unoriginal plot and low-budget special effects. It has a rating of 11% on Rotten Tomatoes based on 9 reviews, with an average rating of 3.70/10

Home media 

Lake Placid 2 was released to DVD on January 29, 2008 on both rated and unrated versions. The unrated Blu-ray was released in 2011.

See also 
 List of killer crocodile films

References

External links 

 
 

2007 television films
2007 films
2007 horror films
2007 action thriller films
2000s comedy horror films
American action thriller films
American comedy horror films
American natural horror films
Films about crocodilians
Films about hunters
Films set in 2007
Films set in Maine
Films shot in Bulgaria
American horror television films
Giant monster films
Lake Placid (film series)
Syfy original films
Television sequel films
Direct-to-video sequel films
20th Century Fox direct-to-video films
Sony Pictures direct-to-video films
American drama television films
2000s English-language films
Films directed by David Flores
2000s American films